Tata Institute of Social Science Hyderabad, also known as TISS Hyderabad, is a social sciences college located in Hyderabad, Telangana.

History
TISS Hyderabad was established in 2012 as an off-campus institution at the invitation of the former government of Andhra Pradesh.

Campus
The current location is in Brahmanapally Road, Turkayamjal, Nagarjuna Sagar Road, Hyderabad.

Inter-disciplinary centres
 Azim Premji School of Education
 School of Livelihoods and Development
 School of Public Policy and Governance
 School of Gender Studies

Schools 
 Azim Premji School of Education
 School of Livelihood Studies & Development
 School of Gender Studies
 School of Human Resource Management
 School of Public Policy and Governance

See also 
Tata Institute of Social Sciences
List of institutions of higher education in Telangana

References

External links
 Official web site

Tata Institute of Social Sciences
Universities and colleges in Hyderabad, India
2008 establishments in Andhra Pradesh
Educational institutions established in 2008